Woodgate Valley Country Park is a country park within the Bartley Green and Quinton districts of Birmingham. It is the third largest Birmingham Country Park after Sutton Park and Lickey Hills Country Park. The park is maintained as a wildlife habitat but also has farm animals.

History

The Country Park was set up in 1984, having previously been rural land with smallholdings and larger farms. The disused Lapal Tunnel of the Dudley No 2 canal passes just south of Hole Farm, north of the visitor centre and on through the South Woodgate housing estate. The tunnel opened in 1798 and was closed to traffic in 1926. Spoil heaps provide visible reminders of the tunnel's construction.

Wild life 

The park is maintained with varied wild life habitats.  There are hedgerows, meadows and woodland, plus Bourn Brook.  More than 80 species of bird, including marsh harrier, long-eared owl and kingfisher; and 250 species of plants including common bluebells, foxgloves and honeysuckle, have been recorded, as have butterflies and various species of dragonflies including red admiral and small tortoiseshell. Many plants grow in the damp meadows. In 2008 muntjac deer were sighted by local residents.

Facilities

Visitors go for a leisurely walk, observe wildlife, walk the dog or ride horses and get away from the noise, traffic and buildings of the city.

A parkrun has been held in the Country Park since August 2021, with 100-200 runners typically participating every Saturday morning.

Woodgate Valley Urban Farm exists as a self-supporting private charitable company. The adjacent Hole Farm Trekking Centre is run by the City Council and caters for horse riding across a range of ages and abilities.  

Rangers based in the Visitor Centre provide recreational and educational activities such as a wild food walk. The Visitor Centre has a café and information displays, and a play area for children and picnic area are just outside.

National Express West Midlands bus route no. 23 stops near the main entrance on Clapgate Lane.

References

External links

Woodgate Valley Country Park info from Birmingham City Council
Woodgate Valley Urban Farm website
Photos of Woodgate Valley Country Park and surrounding area on geograph

Parks and open spaces in Birmingham, West Midlands
Country parks in Birmingham, West Midlands
Woodgate Valley Country Park (Birmingham)
Nature reserves in Birmingham, West Midlands
City farms in England